is a private university in Seijo, Setagaya-ku, Tokyo, Japan. It is operated by the Seijo Gakuen institute. Seijo University has its origins in Seijo Gakuen (成城学園), which was founded in 1917 by Dr. Masataro Sawayanagi, a former Minister of Education. Under the pre-World War II education system it was called ‘Seijo Higher School’. It became Seijo University in 1950. As the founder Masataro Sawayanagi directed, the university values education of respecting and developing individual perspectives by providing a wide range of small-sized classes. 

In 2017, it became 100 years since Seijo Gakuen Education Institute was founded.

Graduate Schools 

Graduate School of Economics
Graduate School of Literature
Graduate School of Law
Graduate School of Social Innovation

Undergraduate Schools

Faculty of Economics - Economics  - Business administration
Faculty of Arts and Literature - Japanese literature (Chinese classical literature, Linguistics)  - English literature (English literature, English linguistics, British and American culture)  - Arts (Music, Play, Films history, Art history in eastern, European and Japanese areas). It is quite rare studies provided from higher education institutes in Japan.   - Cultural history  - Mass communication and medias  - European cultural history
Faculty of Law - Law
Faculty of Social Innovation - Policy innovation  - Psychological society

Others

Seijo University Library
Research Centers  - Economics   - Folklore  - Contemporary Law  - Glocal Studies
Media Network Center (MNC)
International Exchange Office (IEO)
Career Center
Educational Innovation Center

Famous alumni

Tsutomu Hata, former Prime Minister of Japan
Yūko Obuchi, member of House of Representatives of Japan
Taku Eto, member of House of Representatives of Japan
Yoko Komiyama, member of House of Representatives of Japan
Takao Fujii, member of House of Councillors of Japan
Mitsuyoshi Yanagisawa, member of House of Councillors of Japan
Chiaki Ishihara, professor (Waseda University)
Mitsuhiro Seki, professor (Hitotsubashi University)
Sukeyuki Miura, professor (Chiba University, Rissho University)
Masahiko Miyawaki, professor (Waseda University)
Takehiko Iwasaki, associate professor (Kumamoto University)
Nobuhiko Obayashi, movie producer
Hitonari Tsuji, novelist
Hiroshi Ogiwara, novelist
Tetsuya Sato, novelist
Aki Sato, novelist
Minoru Ozawa, haiku poet
Yumi Yoshimoto, songwriter, novelist, essayist
Tomomi Tsutsui, screenwriter, novelist
Chiaki J. Konaka, screenwriter
Yukiko Konosu, essayist, translator
Yuka Saitō, essayist
Shuntaro Ono, literary critic
Minako Saito, literary critic
Naotaro Moriyama, musician
Tomu Muto, member of AKB48
Keiichiro Akagi, actor
Masakazu Tamura, actor
Masahiro Takashima, actor
Masanobu Takashima, actor
Ken Ishiguro, actor
Mitsuhiro Oikawa, actor, singer
Yukiyoshi Ozawa, actor
Kazuki Enari, actor, talent
Shima Iwashita, actress
Satoko Oshima, actress, talent
Honami Suzuki, actress
Mayu Tsuruta, actress
Yuko Ito, actress
Yoshino Kimura, actress
Moe Yamaguchi, actress, talent
Yuka Nomura, actress
Kazuyuki Yoshida, announcer (NHK)
Tomoki Tanaka, announcer (NHK)
Toshihisa Osaka, announcer (NHK)
Jun Ogura, free announcer (NTV), associate professor (Edogawa University)
Hiroki Ando, announcer (TBS)
Kazuhiro Watanabe, announcer (Fuji TV)
Minako Nagai, free announcer (NTV)
Tohko Amemiya, essayist, free announcer (TBS)
Saori Fujimura, announcer (Fuji TV)
Eri Mizuhara, announcer (TV Tokyo)
Yukari Oshima, announcer (Fuji TV)
Erina Masuda, announcer (TBS)
Akiyo Yoshida, announcer (TBS)
Shoko Yoshimura - Amateur wrestler; 5-time world champion

See also

 Lycée Seijo, a defunct boarding school in France affiliated with this university

References

External links
Seijo University - official website
Seijo University - official website 

Private universities and colleges in Japan
Seijo University